Malik Ikhtiyār ad-Dīn Yūzbak, and later Mughith ad-Din Abu al-Muzaffar was the appointed as the Delhi Sultanate's Governor of Bengal from 1251 CE to 1255 CE. He became an independent Sultan of North Bengal from 1255 CE to 1257 CE.

As governor
Yuzbak was appointed Governor of Bengal after Masud Jani was unable to defeat the forces delegated by Emperor Narasingha Deva I of Eastern Ganga for four years. In 1254, he invaded the Azmardan Raj (present-day Ajmiriganj) in northeast Bengal and managed to defeat the local Raja. In 1255, Yuzbak succeeded in repulsing Emperor Narasingha's forces, led by the emperor's son-in-law Savantar, away from south-western Bengal. After capturing Mandaran in western Bengal, Yuzbak fixed the border between the two empires at the Damodar River.

As independent Sultan
Following the recapture of Mandaran and southwestern Bengal, he signed a treaty of alliance with Narasingha and declared himself independent of the Delhi Sultanate. He styled himself as Sultan Mughithuddin Abul Muzaffar Iuzbak and struck coins in his own name. As an independent Sultan, Yuzbak had control over much of northern and northwestern Bengal with his capital in Lakhnauti. By 1256, he captured Bihar and Awadh from Delhi rule with his own army and war-boats, thus extending his powerful domain.

Defeat
In 1257, Yuzbak commenced an expedition to the Kamrup region and Koch Hajo, both in present-day Assam. There, Yuzbak and his forces were faced by the battalion of Sandhya, the erstwhile Rai of Kamrup in Kamarupanagara. With the help of the seasonal spring floods, Sandhya defeated and captured Yuzbak and had him executed in due course.

Following the execution, Yuzbak's domain was split into two with Narasimhadeva I of Eastern Ganga breaking the alliance and taking over the areas he had lost. Yuzbak's fellow tribesman, Ijjauddin Balban Iuzbaki, succeeded him as Governor of Bengal for the Delhi Sultanate.

See also
List of rulers of Bengal
History of Bengal
History of Bangladesh
History of India

References

13th-century Indian Muslims
13th-century Indian monarchs
Governors of Bengal